The Bison Wind Energy Center is a 496.6 megawatt (MW) wind farm spanning southwest Oliver County and north-central Morton County in the U.S. state of North Dakota.   It became the largest wind generating facility in the state upon completion of the fourth construction phase in early 2015.  The facility allowed the investor-owned utility company, Minnesota Power, to obtain more than 25% of its electricity generation from renewable sources,  exceeding Minnesota's 2025 renewable portfolio standard requirement.

Details

The project was developed by Minnesota Power, and its parent company Allete Inc., to harvest the highly productive wind resources in the adjacent state of North Dakota.   The utility provides electricity to several energy-intensive industrial customers which dominate consumption within northern Minnesota's mostly rural economy.  In 2009, the company prepared for the first construction phase with the purchase and upgrade of a 465 mile high-voltage direct current transmission line that would efficiently transport the electricity from the Square Butte Substation near Center, North Dakota to the Arrowhead Substation near Duluth, Minnesota.  The company's plan also called for reducing its purchases of electricity from the coal-fired generating units feeding the Square Butte Substation as the Bison wind facility grew.

Construction of the first phase of 33 wind turbines began in June 2010.   It included 16 Siemens SWT-2.3 MW and 17 Siemens SWT-3.0 MW turbines.   The nacelle and hub components were transported by ship from Siemen's manufacturing facilities in Denmark to Allete's headquarters in Duluth,  then trucked to the facility site about 40 miles west of Bismarck.  The blades and the 80 meter tower sections were manufactured Fort Madison, Iowa and West Fargo, North Dakota, respectively.  A new 22 mile 345 kV transmission connects the new Bison facility substation to the Square Butte Substation.  Phase 1 began sending power to Minnesota by the end of 2010,  and was fully commissioned in February 2012, with a total capital cost of about $177 million.

Construction phases 2 and 3 each consist of 35 Siemens SWT-3.0 MW turbines.  Two phase 1 turbines were transferred to an initial phase 1B grouping which was ultimately included in phase 3. Phases 2 and 3 both came online at the end of 2012.

The latest and largest construction phase 4 began in the fall of 2013 and consists of 64 Siemens SWT-3.2 MW turbines.  These more powerful turbines enable direct drive of the generator unit, thus reducing the number mechanical components and increasing reliability. The 92 meter tower sections  were manufactured in Manitowoc, Wisconsin, a portion of the generator units in Hutchinson, Kansas,  and the blades in Fort Madison, Iowa.  A new 11 mile 345 kV transmission line and substation were constructed to connect the west side of the facility to an expansion of original Bison substation. The cost of this expansion phase was about $345 million,  bringing the total investment in the facility to nearly $800 million.   Phase 4 came online at the beginning of 2015.

In September 2015 Siemens announced that it had been contracted to provide operational and maintenance (O&M) support for the 3.0 MW and 3.2 MW turbines (total of 149 units) at the Bison Wind Energy Center for their first 10 years of operation.   Minnesota Power is continuing to provide O&M support for the remaining 2.3 MW turbines (total of 16 units).

Electricity production 

(*)   partial year of operation

See also

Wind power in North Dakota
List of wind farms in the United States

References

External links
Video Presentation of Bison Wind
Allete Corporate Video

Energy infrastructure completed in 2015
Wind farms in North Dakota
Buildings and structures in Morton County, North Dakota
Buildings and structures in Oliver County, North Dakota